José Afonso Ribeiro T.O.R. (October 28, 1929 – November 10, 2009) was the Roman Catholic bishop of the Territorial Prelature of Borba, Brazil.

Ordained to the priesthood on December 7, 1958, Ribeiro was named auxiliary bishop on January 29, 1974 and was ordained on May 5, 1974. On July 6, 1986, he was named bishop of Borba, retiring on May 3, 2006.

Notes

1929 births
2009 deaths
Franciscan bishops
20th-century Roman Catholic bishops in Brazil
Roman Catholic bishops of São Luíz de Cáceres
Roman Catholic bishops of Borba